Dongguan is a prefecture-level city in central Guangdong Province, China. An important industrial city in the Pearl River Delta, Dongguan borders the provincial capital of Guangzhou to the north, Huizhou to the northeast, Shenzhen to the south, and the Pearl River to the west.

Dongguan's city administration is considered especially progressive in seeking foreign direct investment. Dongguan ranks behind only Shenzhen, Shanghai and Suzhou in exports among Chinese cities, with $65.54 billion in shipments. It is also home to one of the world's largest shopping malls, the New South China Mall, which is seeing increased activity. Although the city is geographically and thus culturally Cantonese in the Weitou form and as well as culturally Hakka in the prefectures of Fenggang and Qingxi, the majority of the modern-day population speaks Mandarin due to the large influx of economic migrants from other parts of China. The city is home to several universities, including Guangdong University of Science and Technology, Guangdong Medical University and Dongguan University of Technology.

History

Although the earliest traces of human habitation in the area stretch back 5,000 years, Dongguan's emergence as a true city is a recent phenomenon.

In 1839, at the outset of the First Opium War, large quantities of seized opium were destroyed in Humen, a town that now belongs to Dongguan. Several of the major battles of the war were fought in this area.

During the Second World War, the city served as the base for guerrilla resistance against the Japanese occupation.

Being a district of the Huiyang prefecture before, as its economy overshadowed the prefectural capital of Huizhou itself, Dongguan earned city status in 1985, and was upgraded to prefecture city status three years later. During this period the city changed its focus from an agricultural town into a manufacturing hub, with an average annual growth of up to 18%.

The city ranked 13th in Forbes China's listing of the most innovative mainland cities, as well as 18th in Foreign Policy's listing of the most dynamic cities in the world.

Geography
It is positioned in the middle of the Guangzhou-Shenzhen economic corridor, a hub for both land and sea transport.

Of Dongguan's total area, 27% is water, 25% forest land, and 13% arable land, while 35% of its land area has been fully developed.

Climate
Dongguan has a dry-winter humid subtropical climate (Köppen climate classification: Cwa), with abundant sunshine and rainfall over the year. It lies just south of the Tropic of Cancer.

Demographics
Dongguan had an estimated 6,949,800 inhabitants at the end of 2008, among whom 1,748,700 were local residents and 5,201,100 permanent migrants from other parts of the country. At the 2010 Census the population had expanded to 8,220,237. The number reached 10.5 million by 2020.

Dongguan is the hometown for many overseas Chinese, the family origin of over 700,000 people in Hong Kong, Taiwan and Macau and over 200,000 Chinese nationals living abroad.

Administration
Dongguan is a prefecture-level city of the Guangdong province. An uncommon administrative feature is that it has no county-level division, but the municipal government does group the 32 township-level divisions into six district areas. The city government directly administers four Subdistricts and 28 towns:

Transport

Air
Dongguan is served by Guangzhou Baiyun International Airport, Shenzhen Bao’an International Airport, but primarily by Hong Kong International Airport; ticketed passengers to HKIA can take ferries from the Humen Ferry Terminal in Humen to the HKIA Skypier. There are also coach bus services connecting Dongguan with HKIA.

Road
Many foreign travellers to Dongguan fly into Hong Kong, which gives visa on arrival to citizens of over 170 countries. After landing, visitors must apply for a visa to enter mainland China. One can travel from Hong Kong to Dongguan by bus, ferry, or train. Passengers travelling overland must disembark from their transport at the Hong Kong/China border to go through customs and immigration, except for those traveling on the Mass Transit Railway intercity services (former Kowloon–Canton Railway) from Hung Hom station to Dongguan, Guangzhou and beyond.

People can also choose to drive between Hong Kong and Dongguan. With the permitted business license plate and driver license, people can drive through the customs located at Shenzhen so that to get to Hong Kong. Normally, it takes three hours for driving. In 2018, G4 Expressway (Beijing - Hong Kong and Macau Expressway) was opened, and Dongguan is one of the cities that G4 Expressway approaches. This benefits people from Dongguan to travel to those cities on G4 Expressway.

The Humen Pearl River Bridge is a suspension bridge over the Pearl River. Construction work on the Second Humen Pearl River Bridge will start in early 2014.

Rail
Dongguan serves as one of the regional railway hubs in Guangdong, where the Guangzhou–Kowloon railway, Guangzhou–Meizhou–Shantou railway and the Beijing–Kowloon railway converge. Rail services in and out of the city call at Dongguan railway station where there are direct train services to Guangzhou East railway station in Guangzhou; and Hung Hom railway station in Hong Kong. High-speed rail services are also available at Humen railway station.

Among the four metro lines (Line 1-Line 4) planned for the Dongguan Rail Transit, Line 2 is presently under construction and was scheduled to open for operations in early 2015. This was delayed and opened in May 2016. Line 2 will link towns in Western Dongguan, thereby promoting the connection of the entire downtown area with Houjie, Humen and Chang'an. It will also support Dongguan's regional transportation with other cities such as Guangzhou, Shenzhen, Hong Kong by joining with the rail transit junctions of the Pearl River Delta.

Economy
Dongguan is a major manufacturing hub, although it suffered significant loss of economic activity from the impact of the 2008 financial crisis. The largest industrial sector is manufacturing of electronics and communications equipment; international companies with facilities in Dongguan include DuPont, Samsung Electronics, Nokia, Coca-Cola, Nestlé and Maersk.

The Dongguan Science and Technology Museum (opened in December 2005), the high tech commerce park in the Songshan Lake district (opened in 2003) and a partnership with the Global IT Academy of the Brea Olinda Unified School District in Southern California have demonstrated the city's emphasis on attracting technology business. The city announced in 2005 a planned investment of US$500 million over five years for technology infrastructure improvements. The city administration is considered especially progressive in seeking foreign direct investment. Among the investors were Brazilian shoe manufacturers. Brazil excelled in manufacturing cheap footwear in the 1970s and 80s. The Brazilian community in Dongguan numbered 4,000 people in 2013.

While the city is the fourth largest export region in China, behind Shanghai, Shenzhen, and Suzhou, Dongguan has yet to gain the kind of name recognition realized by Shenzhen outside of China. This may be because the city has focused on infrastructure investment rather than the direct targeting of major corporations with financial incentives for economic development. Nevertheless, Dongguan has been identified by high level representatives of the National Development and Reform Commission of the central government as one of the most significant growth regions for technology in the coming years. As part of this plan, the Dongguan local government announced a plan to create and support a 100-billion-yuan photovoltaic manufacturing industry by 2015.

To cope with the impact of the financial crisis, Dongguan city is looking to industrial restructuring, focusing on four pillar platforms — governmental services, supporting measures, technology upgrade, and market expansion. The city government claims that this process has already enhanced its capability for independent innovation and the quantity of patent applications in 2008.

In Dongguan, manufacturing is prosperous and with a strong tertiary industry and had a total GDP of 501 billion RMB with the scale proportion of the three major industrial sectors standing at 0.4:46.9:52.7 in 2012.

On 9 February 2014, China Central Television aired a special on the sex industry in Dongguan. The same day Guangdong Provincial Police raided and closed all saunas, bars, foot massages, karaokes, and other businesses associated with the sex industry. The economic impact of this crackdown is believed to be 50 billion yuan, or just over $8 billion US dollars. The residual effects of the crackdown affected the livelihood of taxi drivers and restaurants who, while not directly involved in the sex industry, benefited from the increased clientele.

Sports and culture

Dongguan is dubbed as a "National Basketball City" and is the only prefecture-level city with three professional basketball clubs in China. Established in 1993, the Guangdong Southern Tigers are the first professional basketball club in China, and won eleven Chinese Basketball Association (CBA) championships.

The city hosted Weightlifting events during the 2010 Asian Games at the Dongguan Arena.

The 16,000 seat Dongguan Basketball Center was one of the venues for the 2019 FIBA Basketball World Cup. The venue has also hosted the 2015 Sudirman Cup badminton tournament.

Dongguan Yulan Theater is one of China's newest multipurpose performing arts venues. With its multi-layered exterior suggestive of an unfolding lotus petal, it has become a landmark in Dongguan city. The new cultural hub houses two theatres presenting a full schedule of performances, including Romeo and Juliet and the Chinese classic Butterfly Lovers. So far Dongguan has produced seven original musicals by its own and made a roadshow of 60 performances in over 30 cities of China.

Social issues
The city and province have been the recent focus of press and journalist attention with coverage of the many young Chinese workers, principally females (so-called factory girls), from agricultural areas who work in the area's factories and manufacturing/assembly facilities, where many are housed in large dormitories, usually several to a room.

An article in the High Tech Misery in China series reports research conducted, over 2008 to 2009, on working conditions at one of the city's major keyboard makers (Dongguan Meitai Plastics & Electronics Factory); in it, Meitai factory won some unwanted attention due to the poor conditions for its young, mostly female workers. The article includes details of those conditions, photos, translations of employer's rules and evidence that well-known computer brands use this keyboard supplier's products.

Also, Dongguan has built a notoriety within China for its various types of brothels, massage parlours, nightclubs, sauna centres and karaoke bars. The city had more than 120 top-end luxury hotels and hundreds of other mid-range places that offer illegal sexual services or lease floors to sex operators, and many parts of the broader service sector benefit from the trade brought by visitors. Although much of the business is illegal, police operations to limit these activities were for a long time largely ineffective, in part because corrupt members of the local administration and other officials have business interests in the sector. On 9February 2014, CCTV aired a report about prostitution in Dongguan. In reaction, on the same day, Dongguan police launched a crackdown on brothels, massage parlours, nightclubs, sauna centres and karaoke bars, leading to some commentary that the city's days as China's sex capital were numbered.

Education
The city is home to 650 educational institutions: one general college, a TV University as well as technical and vocational schools, 550 primary schools and 480 kindergartens. Also, Dongguan is home to a wide range of international schools due to the large expat community.   

The number of professional teachers, including those at kindergartens, totals 20,268. A comparatively integrated educational system has been set up including preschool, basic, vocational, higher and lifelong adult education. Senior high school education has developed since 1995.

The Dongguan University of Technology is located in Dongguan.

Tungwah Wenzel International School (TWIS) houses an Olympic-sized swimming pool and one of the first Padel courts in South China. TWIS became the first International Baccalaureate (IB) continuum school in Dongguan in December 2021. It now offers PYP (Primary Year Programme), Middle Year Programme (MYP) and Diploma Programme (authorized on October 25, 2021) education. The school is located at: No. 17 Keyuan Road, Songshan Lake High-Tech Industrial Zone, Dongguan, Guangdong, China.

Festivals
Dongguan hosts the following annual festivals:

Dongguan Lingnan Arts Festival (January)
Dongkeng Workers Festival (Second day of the second lunar month)
Machong Guanyin Festival (Nineteenth day of the second lunar month)
Qingxi Flower Festival (April)
Tea Tea Garden Festival (April)
Qiaotou Lotus Art Festival (June)
Qishi Qiufeng Culture Festival (August)
Machong "Scent of Four Seasons" Cultural Art Festival (September)
Zhangmutou Hong Kong Tourism Festival (September)
Fenggang Hakka Art Festival (During the Lunar Mid-autumn Festival)
Xiegang Mountain Climbing Festival (Third week of September)
(Tangxia) Band Festival (October)
Shatian Water Culture Festival (October to November)
Hengli Niuxu Folk Festival (November)
Liaobu Tourism and Cultural Festival (December)

See also
 List of twin towns and sister cities in China
 Lanwa FC — former football club
 New South China Mall — World's second largest mall
 A Touch of Sin — a film that is partly set in Dongguan

References

Economic profile for Dongguan at HKTDC

External links

 HERE! Dongguan – Your English Guide to a Bustling City 
Dongguan Expats – Expatacular! – Global Expat Community
 Hello! Dongguan A general introduction to the city of DG
www.dongguantoday.com Government funded website, giving a full range of information about Dongguan
Dongguan Live a.k.a. Don't Worry Be Happy A series of videos about something fun to do in DG
 Dongguan Foreign Investment Promotion Bureau
 Dongguan City Government 
Dongguan Bureau of Foreign Trade & Economic Cooperation 
IATT – International Association for Technology Trade

 
Populated places with period of establishment missing
Prefecture-level divisions of Guangdong